Freetown is an unincorporated community in Albemarle County, Virginia. The community got its name because freed slaves settled there. Freetown was established by former slaves who bought the land from Berrell Mason in two acre lots.

References

Unincorporated communities in Virginia
Unincorporated communities in Albemarle County, Virginia